The 1887 Crescent Athletic Club football team was an American football team that represented the Crescent Athletic Club during the 1887 college football season. The 1887 season was Crescent's first as a member of the American Football Union (AFU). The team compiled a 8–1 record (6–0 against AFU opponents), won the AFU championship, and played its home games at Crescent Athletic Club grounds at Ninth Avenue and Ninth Street in Brooklyn. W. H. Ford was the team captain and center rush.

In October 1887, The Brooklyn Daily Eagle described the club's origin and purpose: "The Crescent Club was formed not for the purpose of turning out celebrated athletes and winning prizes, but simply to provide exercise and recreation for its members. . . . The club is composed almost entirely of young men who are engaged in business and have not much time to devote to athletics, and the policy has always been to make it an inexpensive organization and to give the members as much for their money as possible."

Schedule

References

Crescent Athletic Club
Crescent Athletic Club football seasons
Crescent Athletic Club Football